Jakub Józef Orliński (born 8 December 1990) is a Polish operatic countertenor singer and breakdancer. He has performed leading roles with many opera companies, including Carnegie Hall, Metropolitan Opera, Royal Opera House, Warsaw Grand Theatre and Oper Frankfurt.

He is the recipient of numerous international awards including the Gramophone Classical Music Award (2019), International Opera Award (2021) and International Classical Music Award (2022).

Education and career
He was born in 1990 in Warsaw. After singing in a choir as a child, as a teenager Orliński joined a nine-member male vocal group and was chosen to sing countertenor parts in some Renaissance music. He also became a fan of The King's Singers, who inspired him to take his interest in the genre further. He began his music career in the male choir Gregorianum led by Berenika Jozajtis, with which he performed both in Poland and abroad. He is a graduate of the Fryderyk Chopin University of Music. During his studies he participated in a number of performances organized by the Fryderyk Chopin University of Music and the Aleksander Zelwerowicz National Academy of Dramatic Art. 

Since 2012, he has been a member of the Opera Academy of the Grand Theatre in Warsaw, and from 2015 to 2017 he studied at the Juilliard School with Edith Wiens. In Poland, he performed the roles of Cupid in Venus and Adonis by Blow and Narciso in Agrippina by Handel. During his stay in Germany, he performed the role of Ruggiero in Handel's Alcina in Aachen and Cottbus, and performed selected songs by Purcell at the Leipzig Opera.

He has performed in Carnegie Hall as well as Alice Tully Hall at the Lincoln Center for the Performing Arts in New York and met with positive critical reviews from The New York Times. His performances included Handel's Messiah in cooperation with Musica Sacra and Oratorio Society of New York. He also performed in Jonathan Dove's Flight with Juilliard Opera. In 2017, he sang the role of Ottone in Handel's Agrippina with Carnegie Hall's La Serenissima: Music and Arts From the Venetian Republic. He took part in the Karlsruhe Handel Festival where he sang Vivaldi's Nisi Dominus and excerpts from Handel's Dixit Dominus. In the same year, he made his debut appearance at the Festival d'Aix-en-Provence in Cavalli's opera Erismena. He made his debut at the Frankfurt Opera in the 2017/18 season as the title character in Handel's Rinaldo. In 2019, having been invited to perform Eustazio for the Glyndebourne Opera's production in Rinaldo, he was asked two weeks into rehearsals to take over the title role.

Orliński's debut solo album, Anima Sacra, was released on the Erato label on 26 October 2018, with music by orchestra Il Pomo d'Oro conducted by Maxim Emelyanychev.  It consists of Baroque arias by various composers from the Neapolitan School, including what is thought to be world premiere recordings of eight works.

In 2019, he won the O!Lśnienie cultural award presented by Onet and the city of Kraków in the category of classical music and jazz. In October, he won the Gramophone Classical Music Award in the category of Young Artist of the Year. In 2020, he received the Paszport Polityki Award presented by the Polityka yearly in the category of classical music.

A second album Facce d'amore, consisting of "a wide-ranging and well-chosen collection devoted to the many faces of love" from operas by Cavalli, Boretti, Bononcini, Scarlatti, Handel, Predieri, Matteis and Conti, prompted reviewer Brian Robins to commend the singer's "talents as a dramatic singer" and his stylish ornamentation, summing up his voice as "sweet-toned".

In September 2020, he received the Best Singer of the Year title in Berlin awarded by the readers of the Opernwelt magazine. He made his debut at the Metropolitan Opera, NYC, in December 2021 after having been chosen to play the role of Orpheus’s alter-ego in Matthew Aucoin’s opera Eurydice. 

In 2021, he received a Grammy Award nomination in the Best Opera Recording category for his performance in Handel: Agrippina conducted by Maxim Emelyanychev (Il Pomo d'Oro).

In January 2022, he debuted at London's Royal Opera House in the role of Didymus in Katie Mitchell's production of George Frideric Handel's oratorio Theodora.

Having taken the role of Gluck's Orfeo into his repertoire, he has sung in the opera in several venues; for the production by Matthew Ozawa at San Francisco Opera in November 2022, Orliński opened the opera dancing a break routine. One reviewer commented that he was "cast to perfection", and with soprano Meigul Zhang "sang and acted wonderfully, with piquant, youthful urgency".

In 2022, he received his second Grammy Award nomination in the Best Opera Recording category for his performance in Matthew Aucoin's Eurydice produced by the Metropolitan Opera Orchestra and conducted by Yannick Nézet-Séguin.

Personal life
Orliński is a champion break-dancer and is a member of the breakdancing collective Skill Fanatikz Crew. He has also modelled for fashion brands such as Nike and Levi's.

Awards
1st Prize at the Marcella Kochañska Sembrich Vocal Competition, New York, United States (2015)
2nd Prize at the IX International Stanisław Moniuszko Vocal Competition, Warsaw, Poland (2016)
1st Place Winner at the Lyndon Woodside Oratorio-Solo Competition, New York, United States (2016)
Winner of the Grand Finals in the Metropolitan Opera National Council Auditions, New York, United States (2016)
Opus Klassik Award in the Solo Vocal Recital (Opera) category for his performance in Anima Sacra, Germany (2019)
Gramophone Classical Music Award, London, Great Britain (2019)
International Opera Award for Best Recording (Solo Recital), London, Great Britain (2021)
International Classical Music Award for his album Anima Aeterna, France (2022)
Opus Klassik Award in the Audiovisual Music Production category for his performance in Vivaldi: Stabat Mater along with Jan Tomasz Adamus and Capella Cracoviensis, Germany (2022)

Discography

Albums

Video
 Eurydice, opera in 3 acts with music by Matthew Aucoin and an English-language libretto by Sarah Ruhl (Erin Morley as Eurydice, Joshua Hopkins as Orpheus, Jakub Józef Orliński as Orpheus's double, Barry Banks as Hades, Nathan Berg as Eurydice's father, conducted by Yannick Nézet-Séguin), streaming HD video of a live performance at the Metropolitan Opera on 4 December 2021

See also

Music of Poland
Polish opera
List of Poles
Piotr Beczała
Mariusz Kwiecień

References

External links

1990 births
Living people
Musicians from Warsaw
21st-century Polish male opera singers
Operatic countertenors
Chopin University of Music alumni
Juilliard School alumni
Erato Records artists
Winners of the Metropolitan Opera National Council Auditions
Polish performers of early music